Haller is a surname of English and German origin. It is the last name of:

 Albin Haller (1849–1925), French chemist
 Albrecht von Haller (1708–1777), Swiss anatomist and physiologist, also notable for his contributions to botany
 Albrecht von Haller (1758–1823), botanist, son of Albrecht von Haller senior
 Barbara Haller, German female curler
 Benoît Haller (born 1972), French baroque singer and conductor of La Chapelle Rhénane
Beth Haller aka BA Haller was a professor at Towson University
 Berthold Haller (c. 1492–1536), Swiss educator, preacher and church reformer
 Christina Haller (born 1968), German female curler
 David Charles Haller, fictional comic character
 Frank Haller (1883–1939), American boxer
 Gert Haller (1944–2010), German manager
 Gottlieb Emmanuel von Haller (1735–1786), botanist, son of Albrecht von Haller senior
 Granville O. Haller (1819–1897), American Civil War officer and Seattle businessman
 Harry Haller, the subject of Hermann Hesse's Steppenwolf (novel)
 Helmut Haller (1939–2012), West German footballer
 J. Alex Haller (1927–2018), American surgeon
 Johann Haller (1463–1525), Polish printer
 Johannes Evangelist Haller (1825–1900), Archbishop of Salzburg 
 Jost Haller (fl. 1440–1470), Alsatian painter
 Józef Haller (1873–1960), Polish general
 Julia Haller, American ophthalmologist
 Karl Ludwig von Haller (1768–1854), Swiss jurist and author
 Kevin Haller (born 1970), Canadian hockey player
 Martin Haller (1835–1925), German architect, member of the Hamburg Parliament
 Nicolaus Ferdinand Haller (1805–1876), German politician
 Paul Haller Roshi, Buddhist teacher and abbot
 Rene Haller (born 1933), Swiss naturalist
 Salomé Haller, French opera singer
 Sébastien Haller (born 1994), Ivorian footballer
 Stanisław Haller (1872–1940), Polish general, Józef's cousin
 Theodore N. Haller (1864–1930), Seattle businessman and son of G. O. Haller
 Tom Haller (1937–2004), American baseball player
 Wilhelm Haller (1935–2004), South German business and social entrepreneur

See also
 Galler
 Haller von Hallerstein, German and Hungarian noble family
 Haller index, devised by J. Alex Haller and others
 Haller, Luxembourg, a town in eastern Luxembourg
 Haller Lake, lake and neighborhood near Seattle, Washington
 Heller (disambiguation)

German-language surnames